The Ford Flivver is a single-seat aircraft introduced by Henry Ford as the "Model T of the Air". After a fatal crash of a prototype into the ocean off Melbourne, Florida, production plans were halted.

Development
The Ford Trimotor was Henry Ford's first successful commercial aircraft venture in 1925. Following the Ford Model T as an "everyman's" vehicle, the Ford Flivver was designed to be a mass-produced "everyman's" aircraft. The idea was first proposed to William Bushnell Stout, manager of Ford's acquired aircraft division in 1926. Both Stout and William Benson Mayo, head of Ford's Aircraft Division wanted nothing to do with the aircraft and it was built in a nearby museum building in the Ford Laboratories.

The single-seat aircraft was designed with Mr. Ford's instructions that it "fit in his office". The first example was displayed at the 1926 Ford National Reliability Air Tour. The press and public flocked to see "Ford's Flying Car," a single-seat aircraft that had very little in common with the popular Model T "Flivver." Comedian Will Rogers posed for press photos in the aircraft (although he never flew one). A New York Evening Sun columnist wrote the following poem showing excitement for the future flying Fords.
I dreamed I was an angel
And with the angels soared
But I was simply touring
 The heavens in a Ford.
The name of the aircraft, "flivver", originated from a slang word in the early twentieth century designating an inexpensive car.

Design
The aircraft was a welded steel tube fuselage, with wood wing construction with fabric covering. The steerable rudder mounted tailwheel was also the only wheel with a brake. The exhaust was routed through a special manifold to a stock Model T exhaust. The steel landing gear was fastened to the wing and used rubber doughnuts in compression for shock absorption. The designer of the aircraft, Otto Koppen, went on to design the Helio Courier.

Operational history

Ford unveiled the Flivver on his 63rd birthday, July 30, 1926. Ford's chief test pilot was Harry J. Brooks, a young employee who had become a favorite of Ford. Brooks flew the Flivver regularly from his home garage to work at the Ford Laboratory, and later, used the second Flivver to move about the Ford properties. He once flew the aircraft in a race against Gar Wood in Miss America V on the Detroit River during the Harmsworth Trophy Races.

In an attempt to draw on his popularity, Charles Lindbergh was invited to fly the Flivver on a visit to Ford field, August 11, 1927, and was the only other pilot to fly the Flivver prototypes. He later described the Flivver as "one of the worst aircraft he ever flew".

A third prototype, tail number 3218, with "long" wings was built to win a long distance record for light planes in  "C" class.  The race was set from Ford Field in Dearborn Michigan to Miami, Florida. A first attempt launched on 24 January 1928, witnessed by Henry Ford, landed short in Asheville, North Carolina. A second attempt, flying the second prototype, witnessed by Edsel Ford, Brooks launched from Detroit on February 21, 1928 but landed  short in Titusville, Florida, where the propeller was bent, but still achieved a  record.

During his overnight stay at Titusville, Brooks had repaired the aircraft, using the propeller from the aircraft involved in the forced landing. He had also placed wooden toothpicks in the vent holes on his fuel cap to prevent moist air from entering and condensing overnight. On February 25, Brooks took off to complete the flight, circled out over the Atlantic where his motor quit and he went down off Melbourne, Florida. The wreckage of the Ford Flivver washed up, but the pilot was never found. Investigation of the wreckage disclosed that the toothpicks had plugged the fuel cap vent holes, causing an engine stoppage.

Following the death of Brooks, Henry Ford was distraught at the loss of his friend, and light aircraft development was stopped under the Ford brand. In 1931, a new "Air Flivver" or Sky Car was marketed by the Stout division of Ford. Ford went back into light plane development in 1936 with the two-seat Model 15-P. The prototype crashed during flight testing and did not go into production.

Variants

 Original Flivver 2A prototype: Designed around a  wingspan, also built with full-span ailerons that could act as flaps, as well as shortened versions, powered by a  three-cylinder Anzani; two built.
 Flivver 2A (Flivver 3218) The third prototype was larger with a  wingspan, had a fabric-covered steel frame, featured wing struts, a 50-gallon fuel tank, a dihedral increase, and a custom -Ford designed, horizontally opposed two-cylinder engine using Wright Whirlwind components that produced . The final three prototypes had this engine. Crash investigations were based on the pieces of this aircraft that washed ashore.

Aircraft on display
A surviving Flivver resides in the Henry Ford Museum. In 1991, EAA Chapter 159 from Midland, Michigan donated a replica to the EAA AirVenture Museum. The replica was built in 1989 from careful inspection of the original prototype and advice from Otto C. Koppen, the original designer, although it was powered by a two-cylinder Franklin engine. A second replica is on display at the Florida Air Museum.

Specifications (Ford Model 2A Flivver)

See also

References

Notes

Citations

Bibliography

 Corn, Joseph J. The Winged Gospel: America's Romance with Aviation. Baltimore, Maryland: The Johns Hopkins University Press, 2002. .
 Davis, Michael W. R. and James K. Wagner. Ford Dynasty: A Photographic History. Mount Pleasant, South Carolina: Arcadia Publishing, 2002. .
 Ford, Richardson Bryan. Beyond the Model T: The Other Ventures of Henry Ford (Great Lakes Books Publication). Detroit: Wayne State University Press, 1997. .
 O'Callaghan, Timothy J. The Aviation Legacy of Henry & Edsel Ford (Michigan). Livonia, Michigan: First Page Publications, 2001. .
 Pauley, Robert F. Michigan Aircraft Manufacturers (Images of Aviation). Mount Pleasant, South Carolina: Arcadia Publishing, 2009. .

External links

 The Planes: 1926 Ford Flivver
 Ford Flivver 3218 (1928)

Ford aircraft
1920s United States civil utility aircraft
Single-engined tractor aircraft
Low-wing aircraft
Aircraft first flown in 1927